Leake County is a county located in the center of the U.S. state of Mississippi. As of the 2020 census, the population was 21,275. Its county seat is Carthage. The county is named for Walter Leake, the Governor of Mississippi from 1822 to 1825.

In 2010, the center of population of Mississippi was located in Leake County, near the town of Lena.

Geography

Major highways
  Mississippi Highway 13
  Mississippi Highway 16
  Mississippi Highway 25
  Mississippi Highway 35
  Mississippi Highway 43
 Natchez Trace Parkway

Adjacent counties
 Attala County (north)
 Neshoba County (east)
 Scott County (south)
 Madison County (west)

National protected area
 Natchez Trace Parkway (part)

Demographics

2020 census

As of the 2020 United States Census, there were 21,275 people, 8,105 households, and 5,591 families residing in the county.

2010 census
As of the 2010 United States Census, there were 23,805 people living in the county. 49.5% were White, 40.6% Black or African American, 6.0% Native American, 0.2% Asian, 2.8% of some other race and 0.8% of two or more races. 4.3% were Hispanic or Latino (of any race).

2000 census
As of the census of 2000, there were 20,940 people, 7,611 households, and 5,563 families living in the county. The population density was 36 people per square mile (14/km2). There were 8,585 housing units at an average density of 15 per square mile (6/km2). The racial makeup of the county was 56.14% White, 37.42% Black or African American, 4.56% Native American, 0.15% Asian, 0.03% Pacific Islander, 1.14% from other races, and 0.57% from two or more races. 2.10% of the population were Hispanic or Latino of any race.

There were 7,611 households, out of which 34.30% had children under the age of 18 living with them, 52.20% were married couples living together, 16.50% had a female householder with no husband present, and 26.90% were non-families. 24.30% of all households were made up of individuals, and 11.70% had someone living alone who was 65 years of age or older. The average household size was 2.65 and the average family size was 3.13. In the county, the population was spread out, with 26.90% under the age of 18, 10.10% from 18 to 24, 27.00% from 25 to 44, 21.70% from 45 to 64, and 14.30% who were 65 years of age or older. The median age was 35 years. For every 100 females there were 98.00 males. For every 100 females age 18 and over, there were 94.20 males.

The median income for a household in the county was $27,055, and the median income for a family was $32,147. Males had a median income of $27,367 versus $18,307 for females. The per capita income for the county was $13,365. About 18.10% of families and 23.30% of the population were below the poverty line, including 31.90% of those under age 18 and 23.90% of those age 65 or over.

Government and infrastructure
The county is quite rural, with Carthage the only city and three towns.

The Mississippi Department of Corrections contracted for development of the Walnut Grove Youth Correctional Facility, which opened in 2001 in the town of Walnut Grove. The facility was operated by the private Management and Training Corporation (MTC).

By 2006, the Town of Walnut Grove annexed the land of the prison, resulting in an apparent increase in population, which was chiefly associated with prisoners. MTC was repeatedly cited for problems with poor treatment of prisoners, and abuses within the facility. The state closed it in 2016.

Education
The Leake County School District is the sole school district of the county.

Choctaw Tribal School System has two tribal schools in the county: Red Water Elementary School and Standing Pine Elementary School.

East Central Community College is the area community college, including Carthage Career Advancement Center in Leake County.

Racial segregation
Most white students attend private schools while black and Hispanic children attend the local public schools.

Politics

Communities

City
 Carthage (county seat)

Towns
 Lena
 Sebastopol (mostly in Scott County)
 Walnut Grove

Census-designated places
 Redwater
 Standing Pine

Unincorporated communities
 Bolatusha
 Coosa
 Edinburg
 Good Hope
 Hopoca
 Madden
 Midway
 Ofahoma
 Thomastown
 Tuscola
 Wiggins

See also

 Dry counties
 National Register of Historic Places listings in Leake County, Mississippi

References

External links
 Leake County Chamber of Commerce
 Leake County Development Association
 Leake County Courthouse Pictures
 Leake County Genealogy

 
Mississippi counties
1833 establishments in Mississippi
Populated places established in 1833
Majority-minority counties in Mississippi